Svågertorp is a neighbourhood in Malmö, Sweden. Svågertorp contains the Svågertorp railway station and a large shopping area having IKEA, Siba, Bauhaus, Mediamarkt, and similar other stores. The IKEA store in Svågertorp is 44 000 square meters large.

References

Neighbourhoods of Malmö